Moto G (2020) is a series of Android smartphones that are part of the Moto G family developed by Motorola Mobility, a subsidiary of Lenovo.

Release 
The G Power and G Stylus were announced in February 2020, followed by the G Pro in May 2020 and the G Fast in June 2020. The G Power and G Stylus were released in April 2020 for the United States, while the G Fast and G Pro were released in June 2020 for the United States and Europe respectively.

Specifications 
Some specifications such as wireless technologies and storage differ between regions.

References 

Android (operating system) devices
Mobile phones introduced in 2020
Mobile phones with multiple rear cameras
Mobile phones with stylus
Motorola smartphones
Mobile phones with 4K video recording